Jishkariani is a Georgian surname. Notable people with the surname include:

Gia Jishkariani (born 1967), Soviet and Georgian footballer
Mikheil Jishkariani (born 1969), Georgian footballer

Georgian-language surnames